The Newly Recognized Queen's Bath is a unique tide pool on the island of Kauai, Hawaii. The pool is a sinkhole surrounded by igneous rock. Small fish and tiny sea life also live in the tide pool, such as Hawaiian sea urchins, angelfish and the so-called "ghost fish".

The original "Queen's Bath" was located in Kalapana on the Big Island of Hawaii.
It was formed after a lava tube collapsed and filled with fresh water supplied by natural springs. In ancient times only the Alii (Royalty) were permitted entry to the sacred waters. In 1983 Kilauea erupted and in 1987 the original site was destroyed by lava flow. 

Only after the original site on the Big Island of Hawaii was destroyed did the location on Kauai become better known as "Queen's Bath". This tide pool was used for what it sounds like; it was a royal bathing place. It was also used as a place of relaxation when an Alii needed to "wash off the stress".

Recreation

The swimming area is accessible via a short trail.  Parts of the trail are steep with slick mud.  It is a very dangerous site and not recommended for weak hikers or swimmers. In the winter, during periods of high surf, it is considered dangerous. As of June 2021, 30 people had drowned after being swept off the rocks by the sneaker waves.

History
Queen's Bath used to be called Keanalele and known for a mound with the most concentrated complex petroglyphs in Hawai'i.

Sport
Local islanders came up with a sport called "Rushfall" at the Queen's Bath, officially released to the public in 2010.

References

Geography of Kauai
Tourist attractions in Kauai County, Hawaii